The Zăpodie is a right tributary of the river Someșul Mic in Romania. It discharges into the Someșul Mic in Sânnicoară near Cluj-Napoca. The river was polluted by the leachate from the nearby city landfill for many years, until in December 2019 when the landfill was finally closed and a protection wall was completed.

References

Rivers of Romania
Rivers of Cluj County